Tennis events were contested at the 1970 Summer Universiade in Turin, Italy.

Medal summary

Medal table

See also
 Tennis at the Summer Universiade

External links
World University Games Tennis on HickokSports.com

1970
Universiade
1970 Summer Universiade